The UEFA Euro 2016 qualifying Group B was one of the nine groups to decide which teams would qualify for the UEFA Euro 2016 finals tournament. Group B consisted of six teams: Bosnia and Herzegovina, Belgium, Israel, Wales, Cyprus, and Andorra, where they played against each other home-and-away in a round-robin format.

The top two teams, Belgium and Wales, qualified directly for the finals. As third-placed Bosnia and Herzegovina weren't the highest-ranked among all third-placed teams, they advanced to the play-offs, where they lost to the Republic of Ireland and thus failed to qualify.

Standings

Matches 

The fixtures were released by UEFA the same day as the draw, which was held on 23 February 2014 in Nice. Times are CET/CEST, as listed by UEFA (local times are in parentheses).

Goalscorers

Discipline 
A player was automatically suspended for the next match for the following offences:
 Receiving a red card (red card suspensions could be extended for serious offences)
 Receiving three yellow cards in three different matches, as well as after fifth and any subsequent yellow card (yellow card suspensions were carried forward to the play-offs, but not the finals or any other future international matches)
The following suspensions were served during the qualifying matches:

Notes

References

External links 

UEFA Euro 2016 qualifying round Group B

Group B
2014–15 in Israeli football
2015–16 in Israeli football
2014–15 in Welsh football
Q
2014–15 in Belgian football
Q
2014–15 in Andorran football
2015–16 in Andorran football
2014–15 in Bosnia and Herzegovina football
2015–16 in Bosnia and Herzegovina football
2014–15 in Cypriot football
2015–16 in Cypriot football